Vryburg is a large agricultural town with a population of 107500.00 situated in the Dr Ruth Segomotsi Mompati District Municipality of the North West Province of South Africa. It is the seat and the industrial and agricultural heartland of the district of the Bophirima region.

Location 
The town is situated halfway between Kimberley (the capital of the Northern Cape Province) and Mahikeng (the capital of the North West Province). 

Vryburg is on Cecil Rhodes’s great northern railway, which ran from Cape Town through the Kimberley diamond fields, Vryburg, Mafeking, and northwards beyond the Victoria Falls. It is also on the N14 National Road which runs from Gauteng Province in a southwesterly direction through Vryburg, Kuruman and Upington to the mining town of Springbok in the north-western Cape. This road also connects Gauteng Province with Namibia.

The township of Huhudi (Tswana for “running water”) is situated just south of the town.

History

Capital of a Republic
The name Vryburg comes from the period in the 1882 when Vryburg was established as the capital of the Republic of Stellaland.  The Republicans called themselves Vryburgers (“free citizens”), and since the Afrikaans word for “citizen” is burger and the word for “borough” (or “fortress”) is burg the name of the town followed.  The first and only president was G.J. van Niekerk.  A site for the township was selected and named Endvogelfontein. On 15 November the same year, the name was changed to Vryburg. In December that year, newly laid out plots were apportioned to the volunteers by means of a lottery and by February 1883 some 400 farms had been established. The and plots were earned by Afrikaners when they helped a native tribe to get back stolen cattle from another rival native tribe of the region.On 16 August 1883, Administrator Van Niekerk proclaimed the Republic of Stellaland with Vryburg as capital and himself as President.

By 1884 the town consisted of about 20 houses. 

Stellaland split into two rival factions – those who supported annexation into the Cape Colony as mooted by Cecil Rhodes, and those who preferred independence.

British Bechuanaland

In February 1884, the London Convention was signed, making Stellaland a British protectorate, with the Reverend John McKenzie appointed Commissioner to British Bechuanaland. 

In 1885, the British seized the town and incorporated the area into British Bechuanaland, which in turn became part of the Cape Colony in 1895.

Vryburg today is the industrial and agricultural capital of the Bophirima (Western) region.

Concentration camp
During the Second Boer War, the British built a concentration camp here to house Boer women and children.

London Missionary Society

The Tiger Kloof Native Institute was set up south of the town by the London Missionary Society in 1904. A cornerstone for the building of the institute was laid in 1905 by the Earl of Selborne. The stone church on the premises is a national monument.

Colony to Province
By 1910, the Cape Colony became the Cape Province, one of the four provinces of the Union of South Africa and later the Republic of South Africa.  When nine provinces were established in 1994, Vryburg finally became part of the North West Province.

Cold War

Vryburg hosted two squadrons of Dassault Mirage F1 (36 aircraft) of the South African Air Force from 1971 to 1993, co located with a Tank Squadron of 2 Special Service Battalion, 2 Transport and Airlift Squadrons of the Douglas C-47 Skytrain (10 Aircraft), 2 Companies of 1 Parachute Battalion and 6 Companies of the 2 South African Infantry Battalion.

Economy

Beef production

Vryburg is South Africa's largest beef-producing district, with Bonsmara cattle the most popular.   It is sometimes called "the Texas of South Africa".

Other produce
Maize and peanuts are important crops produced in the district. The town hosts South Africa's third largest agricultural show.

The town today is an industrial and agricultural hub. Its modern architecture blends naturally with its surroundings and the well-preserved old buildings are carefully maintained.

Transport
There are roads, rail and air connections to all the major centers in the country. Vryburg is also situated on the main railway line from Cape Town to Botswana and Zimbabwe.

The town is served by Vryburg Airport.

Culture

The Theiler Museum on the farm Armoedsvlakte, 8 km west of Vryburg, holds a collection of equipment used by Sir Arnold Theiler, the veterinarian who established the Onderstepoort veterinary research institute near Pretoria.

Fauna and flora
The Leon Taljaard Nature Reserve is located north west of the town with the Swartfontein resort located adjacent to the reserve. The reserve has a number of animal species including Rhino, Eland, Buffalo, Black Wildebeest, Waterbuck and Springbuck. It is open daily to the public.

See also
 Vryburg High School

References

 Vryburg 1882-1982

External links
 Vryburg.com Online Portal
 Tiger Kloof Educational Institute 
 Onderstepoort Veterinary Institute

Capitals of former nations
Former colonial capitals
Populated places in the Naledi Local Municipality
Second Boer War concentration camps
Populated places established in 1882
Populated places founded by Afrikaners